Orsara Bormida is a comune (municipality) in the Province of Alessandria in the Italian region Piedmont, located about  southeast of Turin and about  south of Alessandria, on the right bank of river Bormida.

Orsara Bormida borders the following municipalities: Montaldo Bormida, Morsasco, Rivalta Bormida, Strevi, and Trisobbio. It lies in a territory which was occupied by a forest; only from the 13th century agriculture took possession of the area. It was a fief of the Malaspina family until 1530. It is home to a castle, built in the 11th century.

References

External links
 Official website

Cities and towns in Piedmont